Auguste Mercier (8 December 1833 – 3 March 1921) was a French general and Minister of War at the time of the Dreyfus Affair.

Military career 
Auguste Mercier was born in Arras. He entered the École Polytechnique at the age of 19 in 1852, and came 4th in a class of 106. He continued for a second period in 1854 and chose to enter the artillery.

Appointed in 1856 as a second lieutenant in the 13th Regiment of Mounted Artillery, then in 1856, he was assigned to the 2nd Regiment of Mounted Artillery. Subsequently he was assigned to the Regiment of Horse Artillery of the Guard.

Promoted to Lieutenant in 1857, he was appointed captain of the 18th Regiment of Horse Artillery in 1860 until December 1861. Next in 1862 he was posted to the 5th Regiment of Foot Artillery. In Mexico from 1862 to 1864, he was deputy commanding general of the depot. He ran the foundry during the siege of Puebla. He was a recipient of the Medal of Mexico, Knight of the Legion of Honour (1863), Knight of the Order of Guadalupe (1865), Knight of the Order of St. Maurice and St. Lazarus (It) (1865).
He received the Order of Charles III in 1869, having accompanied a Spanish general during the Universal Exhibition of 1867.

Franco-Prussian War 
In the countryside around Metz he was briefly a prisoner of war. He then commanded the 16th Battery of the 6th Artillery Regiment in the town. He fought in Neuilly, Courbevoie, and Asnieres. He distinguished himself in the capture of the fort of Issy (Officer of the Legion of Honour) and was present during operations in Paris from 22 May to 1 June 1871.

Member of the Feedback Committee of Calais
1872 Promoted to Cavalry Major
1872 Posted to the 27th Artillery Regiment
1873 Posted to the 18th Artillery Regiment
1874 Directed the Pyrotechnic Military School to 1880
1876 Promoted to Lieutenant Colonel in 1876
1879 Promoted to colonel
1880 Commanded the 2nd Artillery Regiment to 1884
1884 Promoted to brigadier general in 1884
1885 Director of Administrative Services at the Ministry of War to 1886
1886 Appointed artillery commander of the 12th Army Corps to 1888
1888 Director of administrative services at the Ministry of War to 1889
1889 Promoted to major general in 1889
1890 Appointed head of the Third Infantry Division
1890 Promoted to commander of the Legion of Honour
1893 Appointed head of the 18th Army Corps
1893 Appointed minister of war to 1895
1894 Awarded Grand Officer of Nicham Iftikar
1894 Awarded Commander of the Order of the Rising Sun
1894 Awarded Commander 2nd class of Dannebrog
1895 Promoted to Grand Officer of the Legion of Honour
1895 Head of the 4th Army Corps to 1898
1898 Member of the Supreme Council of War
1898 Reserve
Member of the technical committee of artillery, the Powder and Saltpetre Committee, and the Joint Committee of Public Works

Political career 
Mercier was responsible for the War portfolio in December 1893 in the cabinet of Casimir-Perier. He succeeded Julien Loizillon, who had replaced  Charles de Freycinet  at the beginning of 1893. His reputation was that of an intelligent and thoughtful officer, who had Republican sympathies. He was a Catholic, although he married an English Protestant who did not go to Mass, but was open to liberal ideas. He was polite, very talkative, very energetic, and had an amazing memory.

He retained his position in May 1894 in the Cabinet of Dupuy, which probably gave him the notion of being indispensable:

"He cut short everyone, dry, haughty, a provocative self-conceit, infallible and sure of his destiny."

In August 1894, Mercier conditionally released a person which earned him a campaign from the right-wing press who accused him of covering up for "Jews and spies."

In January 1900, Mercier was elected as a nationalist senator for Lower Loire, a seat he held until 1920.

Mercier in the Dreyfus Affair 
In the summer of 1894, Mercier was advised that the "Statistical Section" had intercepted what would become the "bordereau". He understood that "if the offender is found, arrested, and convicted, it will be politically profitable."  In addition, it would "muzzle the far right and the press". He then ordered an internal investigation.

From 7 October 1894, convinced who was the guilty party solely on the basis of the dubious expertise in handwriting of Alphonse Bertillon, Mercier decided on the guilt of Dreyfus. He subsequently never varied in his opinion. He would be for Alfred Dreyfus, the "Chief Criminal."

During the Dreyfus trial, the Military Court required the disclosure of a secret file. As soon as Dreyfus was convicted by the Military Court, he filed a bill to reinstate the death penalty for the crime of treason.
In February 1895, Mercier was replaced at the Ministry of War by Émile Zurlinden, after having demanded the destruction of the Dreyfus secret file. He was then appointed commander of the 4th Region and passed into the reserve in 1898.

In J'accuse ...!, Émile Zola did not understand the importance of Mercier's role and accused him simply of "aiding and abetting, at least through weakness of mind, one of the largest iniquities of the century." Summonsed in the Zola trial in February, "haughty, impassive, precise, disdainfully entrenched in the consciousness of his own infallibility, he declared that Dreyfus was a traitor who had been justly and lawfully convicted" and refused to answer on the existence of secret documents.

Questioned in November 1898 by the Criminal Chamber of the Supreme Court, in the context of the proceedings for review of the 1894 trial, Mercier reaffirmed the guilt of Dreyfus. He declared in this regard that the Criminal Division was bought by the dreyfusard "Syndicate". In June 1899, on the judgment of the Supreme Court, Mercier was the subject of an accusation by the House (228 votes against 277) but he did not give up: "I am not an accused, I remain an accuser".

At the Rennes trial, he presented himself as leader of the anti-dreyfusards. He announced that there would be decisive revelations to come in the nationalist press, as the existence of an original copy of the bordereau annotated by the Kaiser (Wilhelm II of Germany). His testimony before the Military Court brought no new revelations, and he declared:

At the end of 1899, an amnesty law was passed by Parliament, against the fierce opposition of Georges Clemenceau and Jean Jaurès. "The first of the criminals" was now immune from prosecution.

In March 1904, before the Criminal Chamber of the Supreme Court, Mercier again accused Dreyfus. On the eve of the judgment without reference by the Supreme Court, he was unable to provide any "irrefutable" evidence despite the pleas of the anti-Semitic press and the nationalists.

On 13 July 1906, in the Senate, he voted against the reinstatement of Dreyfus and Colonel Georges Picquart to the army. He also accused the Supreme Court of irregularities. On 29 June 1907, before 6000 people at the Salle Wagram, French Action gave him a gold medal in memory of the session in which he had "stood up to the parliamentary madness."

Mercier died in Paris on 3 March 1921 aged 87. Until his last breath, from the depths of his soul, he would never cease to proclaim the guilt of Dreyfus.

Successive Military ranks 
	1856  : Second Lieutenant
	1856  : Lieutenant
	1857  : First Lieutenant
	1860  : Captain
	1865  : First Captain
	1876  : Lieutenant Colonel
	1879  : Colonel
	1884  : Brigadier General
	1889  : Major General

Decorations 
1863	Commemorative medal of the Mexico Expedition
1863	Knight of the Legion of Honour
1865	Knight of the Order of Our Lady of Guadalupe (Mexico)
1865	Knight of the Order of St. Maurice and St. Lazarus (Italy)
1869	Order of Charles III (Spain)
1871	Officer of the Legion of Honour
1890	Commander of the Legion of Honour
1894	Grand Officer Nicham Iftikar (Tunisia)
1894	Commander of the Order of the Rising Sun (Japan)
1894	Commander 2nd class of the Order of Dannebrog (Denmark)
1895	Grand Officer of the Legion of Honour

Notes and references

Notes

References 
2004 (Fr) Général André Bach, The Army of Dreyfus. A Political History of the French Army from Charles X to The Affair, Tallandier,
1981 (Fr) Jean-Denis Bredin, The Affair, Fayard, Paris, 1993 (1st Edition 1981)
1994 (Fr) Jean Doise, A Secret well guarded; Military History of the Dreyfus Affair. Le Seuil, collection : 225p.
2009 (Fr) Serge Doessant, General Andre in the Dreyfus Affair and the Fiches Affair, Editions Glyphe, 396 p

See also
Dreyfus Affair

1833 births
1921 deaths
People from Arras
French generals
People associated with the Dreyfus affair
People affiliated with Action Française
French Ministers of War
French Senators of the Third Republic
École Polytechnique alumni
Grand Officiers of the Légion d'honneur
Commanders of the Order of the Dannebrog
Knights of the Order of Saints Maurice and Lazarus
19th-century Roman Catholics
20th-century Roman Catholics
Senators of Loire-Atlantique